Femke Pluim (born 10 May 1994) is a Dutch athlete whose specialty is pole vaulting. She competed at the 2015 World Championships in Athletics in Beijing, without qualifying for the final. In addition she won the silver medal at the 2013 European Junior Championships.

Pluim started off as a gymnast before turning to athletics in 2011, first doing the sprints and only later the pole vault. Her personal bests in the event are 4.55 metres outdoors (Amsterdam 2015) and 4.47 metres indoors (Apeldoorn 2015).

Competition record

References

1994 births
Living people
Dutch female pole vaulters
World Athletics Championships athletes for the Netherlands
Sportspeople from Gouda, South Holland
Athletes (track and field) at the 2016 Summer Olympics
Olympic athletes of the Netherlands
21st-century Dutch women